is a 1958 black-and-white Japanese horror film directed by Nobuo Nakagawa.

Cast 
 Shōji Nakayama
 Naoko Kubo
 Shigeru Amachi
 Akira Nakamura
 Yōko Mihara
 Fumiko Miyata
 Shin Shibata
 Nagamasa Yamada

References

External links 
 

Japanese horror films
1950s mystery films
Japanese black-and-white films
1958 films
Films directed by Nobuo Nakagawa
Shintoho films
1958 horror films
1950s Japanese films